Wilhelhmine von Zenge (20 August 1780 – 25 April 1852) was a German pastellist. Born either in Berlin or in Frankfurt, she was the daughter of a general, and became engaged to Heinrich von Kleist in 1800. In 1811, however, Kleist committed suicide with a friend. Instead, she married Wilhelm Traugott Krug three years later. She died in Leipzig.

References

1780 births
1852 deaths
German women painters
19th-century German painters
19th-century German male artists
19th-century German women artists
Pastel artists